Life and Death in the Warehouse is a 2022 British television drama film, inspired by real stories of warehouse workers in Britain and the poor conditions they work in. It is written by Helen Black, and stars Poppy Lee Friar and Aimee-Ffion Edwards.

Plot
Floor worker Alys (Friar) works in a distribution centre, under a demanding sixty-hour week on top of being pregnant. When her old friend Megan (Edwards) joins the team as a trainee manager, Alys hopes their shared history will benefit her. But, desperate to keep her new job, Megan is soon pushing Alys' work (her 'pick rate') to a dangerous extent.

Cast
Poppy Lee Friar as Alys
Aimee-Ffion Edwards as Megan
Aled ap Steffan as Devon 	
Natalia Kostrzewa as Nadia 	
Maja Laskowska as Karina 	
Leon Charles as Craig 	
Darren Evans as Ricky

Production
Black had met Aysha Rafaele and Marco Crivellari at BBC Studios, at first developing a legal drama series. Subsequently, she was asked to work on a factual drama with director Joe Bullman, drawing from his research into warehouse employees.

Reception
Lucy Mangan of The Guardian awarded the film four out five stars, praising its examination of worker conditions, remarking 'Black's drama does this perfectly, aided by fine performances (including Aled ap Steffan as Alys's friend, co-worker and brave union rep Devon). It covers a lot of sociopolitical ground without forgetting to make us care about the people – those 1 million and counting – who are suffering as its footsoldiers.'. Anita Singh in The Telegraph also gave it four out five stars, calling it 'cutting'.

Awards
The film has been nominated at the 2022 BAFTA Cymru Awards for Television Drama.

References

External links
 

2022 in British television
British television films
2022 films